Harkirat Singh Kalsi, born on 13 July 1994, is an Indian professional road racing cyclist who rides for the Mahashtra Cycling Team (U-15) . Ranked fifth in the country, he won the Maharashtra state Championship '09 under the Amateur Cycling Association of Bombay Suburban District in the boys under 16.

References

1994 births
Living people
Indian male cyclists
Sportspeople from Mumbai